Fazlabad  is a village in Kapurthala district of Punjab State, India. The village is administrated by a Sarpanch, who is an elected representative.

Demography 
According to the report published by Census India in 2011, Fazlabad has a total number of 134 houses and population of 735  of which include 397 males and 338 females. Literacy rate of Fazlabad is 83.21%, higher than state average of 75.84%.  The population of children under the age of 6 years is 74 which is  10.07% of total population of Fazlabad, and child sex ratio is approximately  721, lower than state average of 846.

Population data

Air travel connectivity 
The closest airport to the village is Sri Guru Ram Dass Jee International Airport.

Villages in Kapurthala

External links
  Villages in Kapurthala
 Kapurthala Villages List

References

Villages in Kapurthala district